Make Me a Star may refer to:

 Make Me a Star (film), a 1932 American pre-Code romantic comedy film
 Make Me a Star (album), a 1979 album by The Square 
 Make Me a Star (song), a song by KC and the Sunshine Band